Linda June Mackenzie, OAM (born 14 December 1983) is an Australian freestyle swimmer.  She preferred the longer 200-, 400-, and 800-metre events and won the Australian 400-metre national title five years in a row (2004–2008). She was part of the Australian team that won the gold medal in the 4×200-metre freestyle relay at the 2006 Commonwealth Games in Melbourne and has picked up silver medals in the same event at the 2003 and 2005 world championships.

Mackenzie qualified for the 200-metre and 400-metre freestyle events at the Olympic Games in Beijing and was a member of the winning Australian team in the women's 4×200-metre freestyle relay.  She was the last swimmer in the 4×200-metre freestyle relay at the 2008 Beijing Olympics.  Together with Stephanie Rice, Bronte Barratt and Kylie Palmer the world record was broken by 5.78 seconds.

She was an Australian Institute of Sport scholarship holder.

See also
 World record progression 4 × 200 metres freestyle relay

References

External links

 Swimming Australia profile

1983 births
Living people
Sportspeople from Mackay, Queensland
Commonwealth Games gold medallists for Australia
Swimmers at the 2006 Commonwealth Games
Olympic swimmers of Australia
Olympic gold medalists for Australia
Swimmers at the 2008 Summer Olympics
World record setters in swimming
Australian Institute of Sport swimmers
Australian female freestyle swimmers
World Aquatics Championships medalists in swimming
Medalists at the 2008 Summer Olympics
Swimmers at the 2004 Summer Olympics
Olympic gold medalists in swimming
Commonwealth Games medallists in swimming
Recipients of the Medal of the Order of Australia
21st-century Australian women
Medallists at the 2006 Commonwealth Games